The Judo competition at the 2009 East Asian Games was contested in nine weight classes, nine each for men and women.

This competition was held at Shek Kip Mei Park, from 12 to 13 December 2009.

Medal overview

Men

Women

Medals table

Sources
The official website of Hong Kong 2009 East Asian Games -Games Results-

External links
Judo Union of Asia

 
2009
Asian Games, East
Asian Games, East